Lee Enterprises, Inc. is a publicly traded American media company. It publishes 77 daily newspapers in 26 states, and more than 350 weekly, classified, and specialty publications. Lee Enterprises was founded in 1890 by Alfred Wilson Lee and is based in Davenport, Iowa.

The company also provides online services, including websites supporting its daily newspapers and other publications. Lee had more than 25 million unique web and mobile visitors monthly, with 209.1 million pages viewed. Lee became majority partner of TownNews.com in 1996; Town News creates software for newspaper publication purposes. The company offers commercial printing services to its customers.

Lee Enterprises is currently the fourth largest newspaper group in the United States of America. The company acquired Howard Publications (16 daily newspapers) for $694 million in 2002 and Pulitzer, Inc. (14 daily, over 100 non-daily), for $1.5 billion in 2005. 

From January 2012 to April 2017, the company's executive chairman, Mary Junck, was chairman of the Associated Press. In December 2018, Lee Enterprises announced that Mary Junck would transition from Executive Chairman to Chairman of the company.

In January 2020, Lee Enterprises announced an agreement with Berkshire Hathaway to acquire BH Media Group's publications and The Buffalo News for $140 million in cash.

In November 2021, global hedge fund Alden Global Capital made an offer to acquire Lee Enterprises for $24 per share, or about $141 million. In response, the board of Lee Enterprises enacted a shareholder rights plan, colloquially known as a "poison pill", in order to ward off the purchase attempt. Then, in early December, the board of Lee unanimously rejected the Alden bid, saying that the Alden proposal "grossly undervalues Lee and fails to recognize the strength of our business today."

In November 2021, the U.S. Department of Justice alleged two Iranian nationals had accessed the company's content management system in the fall of 2020, aiming to post false news about the presidential election.

Significant events

Sale of television subsidiary 

Lee operated a broadcasting division, which it sold in 2000 to pay off debt and in order to focus on newspaper publishing. Most of the TV stations were sold to Emmis Communications, and have all been sold, as of 2007, to other companies.

Chapter 11 bankruptcy and bailout reorganization 

The company filed for Chapter 11 bankruptcy in 2011. It emerged from bankruptcy less than two months later. In April 2012, Warren Buffett took a stake in Lee Enterprises (through Berkshire Hathaway Inc.), buying $85 million of the company's debt from Goldman Sachs Group.

In June 2012, Berkshire Hathaway filed an amended Form 13F (13F-HR/A) for the period ending March 31, 2012. This document disclosed that Berkshire accumulated $2,119,000 or 1,655,125 common shares of Lee Enterprises, or a 3.2 percent stake. The document noted that the confidentiality of this transaction was requested but denied by the SEC on May 25, 2012.

Debt recapitalization 
In April 2013, Lee Enterprises announced that Berkshire Hathaway refinanced the remaining Pulitzer acquisition debt equating to $94 million, at no cost. The collateral involved was the TNI Partner stake including the Arizona Daily Star and azstarnet.com. The result of this was a reduction in interest from a variable rate of 11.3% to a fixed rate of 9%, and an extension of the debt maturity date of the debt from December 2015 to April 2017. At the time of the announcement Lee Enterprises noted there was $893 million left to pay off. Lee paid off and retired its New Pulitzer notes in June 2015, six months before the original maturity date and 22 months before the new maturity date. Lee also refinanced its remaining debt in 2014 in order to extend the maturities from 2015 and 2017 to 2019 and 2022. Lee retired its 1st Lien Term Loan in November 2018, four months before its scheduled March 2019 maturity.

On June 27, 2018, Lee Enterprises and Berkshire Hathaway reached a five-year agreement to allow Lee Enterprises to manage Berkshire Hathaway's newspaper and digital operations.

BH Media Group acquisition 

On January 29, 2020, Lee Enterprises announced an agreement to buy Berkshire Hathaway’s BH Media Group publications and The Buffalo News for $140 million cash. The acquisition comprised 30 daily newspapers in 10 states plus 49 paid weekly publications with digital sites, as well as 32 other additional print products. Daily papers include the Omaha World-Herald, Morning News (Florence), Tulsa World, and Winston-Salem Journal. Lee entered into a 10-year lease for BH Media’s real estate as part of the agreement.

To finance the acquisition, Berkshire Hathaway provided $576 million in long-term financing to Lee at 9% per annum. Lee Enterprises used the funds to pay for the Berkshire properties and to refinance its roughly $400 million in existing debt. Much of this remains from the purchase of Pulitzer Inc. for $1.5 billion in 2005. Berkshire became Lee’s sole lender after the deal closed on March 16, 2020.

“We had zero interest in selling the group to anyone else for one simple reason: We believe that Lee is best positioned to manage through the industry’s challenges,” Warren Buffett said in a statement.

Attempted acquisition by Alden Global Capital 

Alden Global Capital purchased a 5.9-percent stake in Lee Enterprises in January 2020. 

In November 2021, Alden made an offer to Lee to purchase the company in its entirety for roughly $141 million.

In response, the board of Lee Enterprises enacted a shareholder rights plan, colloquially known as a "poison pill", in order to ward off the purchase attempt. The specific shareholder rights plan adopted by the Lee board forbids Alden from purchasing more than 10% of the company, and will be in force for one year. The rationale offered by the board was, “Consistent with its fiduciary duties, Lee’s Board has taken this action to ensure our shareholders receive fair treatment, full transparency and protection in connection with Alden’s unsolicited proposal to acquire Lee."

In early December, the board of Lee unanimously rejected the Alden bid, saying that the Alden proposal "grossly undervalues Lee and fails to recognize the strength of our business today." Shortly thereafter, Alden Global, through its operating unit Strategic Investment Opportunities, filed a lawsuit in state court in Delaware against Lee Enterprises. The Alden lawsuit asserts that the members of the Lee board "have every reason to maintain the status quo and their lucrative corporate positions" and that they are "focused more on [their] own power than what's best for the company."

In mid-February 2022, the Delaware court found in favor of Lee Enterprises. In the face of that setback, Alden said it would turn to the tactic of filing a proxy statement asking the company's shareholders to vote no on board members Mary Junck and Herbert Moloney during the March 2022 board elections. This attempt also failed, as shareholders returned both directors to the Lee board despite Alden's opposition.

2022 layoffs

In May 2022 Lee Enterprises reportedly laid off roughly 400 staffers, roughly 10% of the workforce. The reduction was spread across about 19 of the chain's 75 newspapers and included roles in corporate headquarters.

Some of the layoffs included the editor of The Eagle in Bryan, Texas and the publisher of The Bismarck Tribune in Bismarck, North Dakota.

Newspapers
Lee Enterprises owns 77 daily newspapers and approximately 350 specialty publications in 26 states. The company's portfolio grew substantially, nearly doubling its audience size, with the acquisition of BH Media Group's publications in early 2020, including the Omaha World-Herald, Richmond (Virginia) Times-Dispatch and Tulsa World. 

In January 2020, Lee Enterprises sold its newspaper and digital media operations in southern Oregon to Country Media, Inc. The sale included The World (Coos Bay), the Bandon Western World and The Umpqua Post. Lee had purchased the papers as part of its acquisition of Pulitzer, Inc. in 2005.

In March 2020, Lee sold the Santa Maria Times, The Lompoc Record, The Hanford Sentinel and the Santa Ynez Valley News, all in California, to Santa Maria News Media Inc., a newly-formed company led by a group of Canadian newspaper executives. 

Other publications Lee has formerly owned include the North County Times, The Garden Island, The Provo Daily Herald, Daily Chronicle, Rhinelander Daily News, Shawano Leader, and The Ledger Independent of Maysville, KY.

List of Newspapers
Source:

References

External links
 

 
Mass media in the Quad Cities
1890 establishments in Iowa
Companies based in Iowa
Companies based in the Quad Cities
Companies listed on the Nasdaq
Companies formerly listed on the New York Stock Exchange
Companies that filed for Chapter 11 bankruptcy in 2011
Davenport, Iowa
Newspaper companies of the United States
Publishing companies established in 1890